The 39th Electronic Warfare Squadron is an active United States Air Force unit.  It is assigned to the 850th Spectrum Warfare Group at Eglin Air Force Base, Florida.

The first predecessor of the squadron was the 739th Bombardment Squadron, which was activated in June 1943.  After training in the United States with the Consolidated B-24 Liberator, the 739th deployed to the Mediterranean Theater of Operations, participating in the strategic bombing campaign against Germany.   It earned two Distinguished Unit Citations for its combat operations.  Following V-E Day, the squadron returned to the United States for conversion as a very heavy bomber unit, but was inactivated instead.

The 39th Tactical Electronic Warfare Squadron was activated at Spangdahlem Air Base, Germany in 1969, where it was assigned to the 52d Tactical Fighter Wing until inactivating in January 1973.  The two squadrons were consolidated in 1985.

Mission
The 39th Electronic Warfare Squadron supports electronic warfare reprogramming and electromagnetic spectrum operations through centralized and standardized intelligence data, the SPECTRE Software Suite, modeling and simulation and by fielding electronic attack techniques.

History

World War II

The squadron was first organized at Alamogordo Army Air Field, New Mexico on 1 June 1943 as one of the four squadrons of the 454th Bombardment Group.  It trained with Consolidated B-24 Liberator bombers.  After completing training, it left for the Mediterranean Theater of Operations on 8 December 1943.

The squadron arrived in Italy in January 1944, settling in at its combat station, San Giovanni Airfield, by the end of the month. Its primary focus was on long range bombing missions against industrial targets such as enemy oil refineries and munitions and aircraft factories.  It struck transportation targets including harbors and airfields in Italy, France, Germany, Austria, Czechoslovakia, Hungary, Yugoslavia, Greece and Rumania The squadron received a Distinguished Unit Citation (DUC) for a raid on an airfield at Bad Vöslau, Austria on 12 April 1944. The squadron earned a second DUC during an attack on a steel plant at Linz, Austria, as the 454th Group led its wing through determined opposition.

The squadron also flew air support and air interdiction missions against marshalling yards, troop concentrations and rail lines for Operation Strangle.  The squadron participated in the drive to Rome; Operation Dragoon, the invasion of southern France; and Operation Grapeshot, the Spring 1945 offensive in Northern Italy.

The squadron left Italy in July 1945 and reformed at Sioux Falls Army Air Field, South Dakota the following month.  It was redesignated as a very heavy bombardment squadron in anticipation of training and redeployment to the Pacific, but with the Japanese surrender, it was inactivated in October.

Air Force Reserve
The 739th Bombardment Squadron was reactivated as a reserve unit under Air Defense Command (ADC) at McChord Field, Washington in April 1947 as a Boeing B-29 Superfortress unit, where its training was supervised by the 406th AAF Base Unit (later the 2345th Air Force Reserve Training Center). However, the squadron does not appear to have been fully staffed or equipped with operational aircraft while a reserve unit. In 1948 Continental Air Command assumed responsibility for managing reserve and Air National Guard units from ADC. President Truman's reduced 1949 defense budget required reductions in the number of units in the Air Force. Continental Air Command also reorganized its reserve units under the wing base organization system in June 1949.  The squadron was inactivated and its personnel and equipment were transferred to elements of the 302d Troop Carrier Wing, which was activated simultaneously.

Cold War
The 39th Tactical Electronic Warfare Squadron was activated in April 1969 at Spangdahlem Air Base Germany in an effort to restore an electronic warfare capability to United States Air Forces Europe (USAFE).  It was planned to equip the squadron with Douglas EB-66 Destroyers, but all of USAFE's EB-66s had deployed to Southeast Asia to provide jamming support for the Viet Nam War.  As a result, the squadron was initially equipped with the less capable Martin EB-57 Canberra.  Shortly after activation, it became possible to equip the unit with sixteen EB-66s. The squadron continued its mission at Spangdahlem until ceasing operations in December 1972. 
It was inactivated in January 1973 as the EB-66 was withdrawn from the Air Force inventory.

The 739th Bombardment Squadron and the 39th Tactical Electronic Warfare Squadron were consolidated into a single unit in September 1985.

Post Cold War
The squadron was redesignated the 39th Electronic Warfare Squadron and activated at Eglin Air Force Base, Florida in July 2020. The squadron absorbed the resources of Detachment 1, 453d Electronic Warfare Squadron, which was discontinued.

Lineage
739th Bombardment Squadron
 Constituted as the 739th Bombardment Squadron (Heavy) on 14 May 1943
 Activated on 1 June 1943
 Redesignated 739th Bombardment Squadron, Heavy c. 1944
 Redesignated 739th Bombardment Squadron, Very Heavy on 5 August 1945
 Inactivated on 17 October 1945
 Activated in the reserve on 16 August 1947
 Inactivated on 27 June 1949
 Consolidated on 19 September 1985 with the 39th Tactical Electronic Warfare Squadron as the 39th Tactical Electronic Warfare Squadron

39th Tactical Electronic Warfare Squadron
 Constituted as the 39th Tactical Electronic Warfare Squadron on 18 March 1969
 Activated on 1 April 1969
 Inactivated on 1 January 1973
 Consolidated on 19 September 1985 with the 739th Bombardment Squadron
 Redesignated 39th Electronic Warfare Squadron
 Activated c. 23 July 2020

Assignments
 454th Bombardment Group, 1 June 1943 – 17 October 1945
 454th Bombardment Group, 16 August 1947 – 27 June 1949
 36th Tactical Fighter Wing, 1 April 1969
 52d Tactical Fighter Wing, 31 December 1971 – 1 January 1973
 53d Electronic Warfare Group, c. 23 July 2020
 850th Spectrum Warfare Group, c. 25 June 2021 – present

Stations
 Alamogordo Army Air Field, New Mexico 1 June 1943
 Davis–Monthan Field, Arizona, 1 July 1943
 McCook Army Air Field, Nebraska, 30 July 1943
 Charleston Army Air Field, South Carolina 3 October 1943 – December 1943
 San Giovanni Airfield, Italy, 21 January 1944 – July 1945
 Sioux Falls Army Air Field, South Dakota, 1 August 1945
 Pyote Army Air Field, Texas 17 August 1945 – 17 October 1945
 McChord Field (later McChord Air Force Base), Washington, 27 April 1947 – 27 June 1949
 Spangdahlem Air Base, Germany, 1 April 1969 – 1 January 1973
 Eglin Air Force Base, Florida, c. 23 July 2020 – present

Aircraft
 Consolidated B-24 Liberator, 1943–1945
 Martin EB-57 Canberra, 1969
 Douglas EB-66 Destroyer, 1969–1973

Awards and campaigns

See also
 List of B-57 units of the United States Air Force
 B-24 Liberator units of the United States Army Air Forces

References

Notes

Bibliography

Further reading
 

Electronic combat squadrons of the United States Air Force